Oteri is a surname. Notable people with the name include:

 Cheri Oteri (born 1962), American comedic actress
 Frank J. Oteri (born 1964), American composer and music journalist
 Tom Oteri (died 2008), discoverer, publisher and best friend of American songwriter and musician Richard Fagan, who inadvertently caused Oteri's death

See also
 Ottery (disambiguation)